Operation Nachshon (Mivtza Nahshon) was a Jewish military operation during the 1948 war. Lasting from 5–16 April 1948, its objective was to break the Siege of Jerusalem by opening the Tel Aviv – Jerusalem road blockaded by Palestinian Arabs and to supply food and weapons to the isolated Jewish community of Jerusalem. The operation was also known as "The operation to take control of the Jerusalem road,", following which participating units later broke off to form the Harel Brigade.

Nachshon was the first major Haganah operation and the first step of Plan Dalet, The plan was a set of guidelines for taking control of the territory allotted to Palestinian Jews by the 1947 UN Partition Plan, and defending its borders and people, including the Palestinian Jewish population outside the borders, 'before, and in anticipation of' the invasion by regular Arab armies. According to the Israeli Yehoshafat Harkabi, "Plan Dalet" called for the conquest of Arab towns and villages inside and along the borders of the area allocated to the proposed Jewish State pursuant to the UN Partition Plan. In case of resistance, the Arabs of conquered villages were to be expelled outside the borders of the Jewish state. If no resistance was met, the Arab residents could stay put, under military rule. Operation Nachshon was carried out by the Haganah's Givati and what was later to be known as the Harel Brigade of the Palmach.

Background

By the end of March 1948, Abd al-Qadir al-Husayni's troops were preventing supply convoys from reaching Jerusalem. The city was besieged and the Jewish population was forced to adhere to a rationing system. On 31 March a 60 vehicle Jewish convoy was ambushed at Khulda and forced to turn back with the loss of five vehicles and 17 dead. Yishuv leader David Ben-Gurion decided to launch Nachshon in order to open up the city and provide supplies to the Jewish residents. Although initially intended as a one-shot affair, Nachshon later proved to be the first operation in the implementation of Plan Dalet.

The operation

The operation was named after the Biblical figure Nachshon Ben Aminadav, who was the first to wade into the Red Sea when the Hebrews escaped from slavery in Egypt. The operation was commanded by Shimon Avidan.

The first orders were given on 2 April 1948. A telegraph confirming the beginning of the operation was released on 5 April, with the operation starting that same night. It lasted until 20 April. 1,500 men from the Givati and Harel brigades took control of the road to Jerusalem, allowing three of four convoys to get to the city.

The operation was a military success. All the Arab villages that blocked the route were either taken or destroyed, and the Jewish forces were victorious in all their engagements. Nonetheless, not all the objectives of the operation were achieved, as only 1,800 tonnes of the 3,000 envisaged were transported to the town, and two months of severe rationing had to be assumed.

Abd al-Qadir al-Husayni was killed during the night of 7–8 April, in the middle of the battles taking place in Al-Qastal. The loss of the charismatic Palestinian leader 'disrupted the Arab strategy and organisation in the area of Jerusalem.' His successor, Emil Ghuri, changed tactics: instead of provoking a series of ambushes throughout the route, he had a huge road block erected at Bab-el-Oued, and Jerusalem was once again isolated as a consequence.

During Operation Nachshon the Haganah wanted to attack the strategic village of Abu Gosh but this was opposed by the Stern Gang whose local commanders were on good terms with the mukhtar.

Aftermath
Operation Nachshon exposed the poor military organisation of the Palestinian paramilitary groups. Due to lack of logistics, particularly food and ammunition, they were incapable of maintaining engagements that were more than a few hours away from their permanent bases.

Faced with these events, the Arab Higher Committee asked Alan Cunningham to allow the return of the Mufti, the only person capable of redressing the situation. Despite obtaining permission, the Mufti did not get to Jerusalem. His declining prestige cleared the way for the expansion of the influence of the Arab Liberation Army and of Fawzi al-Qawuqji in the Jerusalem area.

Between 15 and 20 April, three convoys, totalling over 700 lorries were able to reach Jewish Jerusalem. The Arabs, however, managed to block the road immediately thereafter. Operation Nachshon was therefore followed by Operation Harel, and immediately thereafter Operation Yevusi. Further operations in the Jerusalem region, Operation Maccabi and Operation Kilshon, took place in May.

Palestinian communities captured during Operation Nachshon

Sources:
Walid Khalidi, All That Remains, .
Benny Morris, The Birth of the Palestinian refugee problem, 1947–1949, .

See also
1948 Arab-Israeli War
Burma Road (Israel)
Depopulated Palestinian locations in Israel

References

Notes

Bibliography
Yoav Gelber, Palestine 1948, Sussex Academic Press, Brighton, 2006, 
Efraïm Karsh, The Arab-Israeli Conflict – The Palestine War 1948, Osprey Publishing, 2002, 
Dominique Lapierre and Larry Collins, O Jérusalem, Robert Laffont, 1971, 
Benny Morris, The Birth of the Palestinian Refugee Problem Revisited, Cambridge University Press, 2003, 
Benny Morris, 1948: A History of the First Arab-Israeli War, New Haven: Yale University Press, 2009

Nachshon
April 1948 events in Asia
1948 in Mandatory Palestine